Whose Life Is It Anyway may refer to:

 Whose Life Is It Anyway? (1972 television play), television play by English playwright Brian Clark, directed by Richard Everitt
 Whose Life Is It Anyway? (play), stage adaptation by Brian Clark, opened 1978 (London) and 1979 (New York)
 Whose Life Is It Anyway? (1981 film), adaptation directed by John Badham
 Whose Life is it Anyway? a novel adaptation by David Benedictus

See also
 Whose Life (Is It Anyways?), a song by Megadeth
 Whose Line Is It Anyway?, a short-form improvisational comedy TV show